The New Zealand Initiative is a pro-free-market public-policy think tank and business membership organisation in New Zealand. It was formed in 2012 by merger of the New Zealand Business Roundtable (NZBR) and the New Zealand Institute. The Initiative’s main areas of focus include economic policy, housing, education, local government, welfare, immigration and fisheries.

Economist Oliver Hartwich has been the executive director of The Initiative since its formation in 2012.

Background 
The New Zealand Initiative's predecessor organisations were both business membership organisations. The Wellington-based Business Roundtable, founded by Roger Kerr in 1986, was among the main proponents of New Zealand's liberal economic reforms of the 1980s and 1990s. To that end, the Business Roundtable produced a wide range of publications (books, reports, submissions) and undertook other activities that informed and influenced public debate.

The New Zealand Institute was established in Auckland in 2004. Like the Business Roundtable, the New Zealand Institute was a business membership organisation that operated as a think tank, albeit with a more centrist political tilt. Some members of the Business Roundtable moved their support to the New Zealand Institute.

By 2011, according to New Zealand Institute chairman Tony Carter, the organisation lacked scale. Carter approached Business Roundtable chairman Roger Partridge and raised the possibility of merging the two organisations. The merger discussions were successful and the New Zealand Initiative was launched in April 2012, with Partridge and Carter as co-chairs. Hartwich was appointed its first executive director.

Organisation 
The New Zealand Initiative is based in Wellington. It is a limited company, governed by a board of directors under a constitution. It is one of the three biggest think tanks in New Zealand, the other two being the New Zealand Institute of Economic Research (NZIER) and Business and Economic Research (BERL).

The membership of The New Zealand Initiative comprises about 70 members, mainly large New Zealand companies. According to the Initiative’s Annual Report 2016, the combined revenue of its members equals a quarter of the New Zealand economy.

The chief editor of the New Zealand Initiative, Nathan Smith, resigned from the position in December 2020 after news reports emerged that he was the author of a far-right blog. In this blog he said, amongst other things, that the media controls people's thoughts and authors lengthy posts tying together "Muslim rape gangs" and incel ideology. Hartwich said that these views were "abhorrent" and had no place at the New Zealand Initiative.

Approach 
On its website, The New Zealand Initiative says its mission is "to help create a competitive, open and dynamic economy and a free, prosperous, fair, and cohesive society" and describes itself as "strictly non-partisan." It takes a more free-market perspective than the NZIER or BERL.

Apart from its research activities, the New Zealand Initiative hosts a range of events. These include public forums, panel discussions, an annual debating tournament for university students, as well as events for its members. In May 2017, The Initiative organised a study tour of Switzerland for more than 30 senior New Zealand business leaders.

Among the speakers hosted by The New Zealand Initiative are New Zealand Prime Ministers John Key and Bill English, Leaders of the Labour Party David Shearer, David Cunliffe and Andrew Little, former Australian Prime Minister John Howard, former British Trade Secretary Peter Lilley as well as members of all parties represented in the New Zealand Parliament.

The New Zealand Initiative released Manifesto 2017: What the next New Zealand Government Should Do, an overview of its policy recommendations from its first five years, in the lead-up to the 2017 general election.

Policy positions and public reception

Education
In July 2017, the New Zealand Initiative has called for the performance measurement and management of teachers in New Zealand schools, a proposal that was cautiously welcomed by Minister of Education Nikki Kaye and rejected by the teachers' union Post Primary Teachers' Association (PPTA). In an earlier report, the Initiative had criticised the New Zealand government for introducing new teaching methods in mathematics that led to worsening numeracy of students. In September 2022, the NZ Initiative asked the Ministry of Education to provide evidence that large, open-plan classrooms helped improve students' learning.

Housing and local government
According to business columnist Pattrick Smellie in 2017, the New Zealand Initiative's main contribution to the housing debate was to point out the factors that were limiting housing supply: Along with high immigration, a sub-scale building industry, and dysfunctional planning law, the incentives for local councils to discourage rather than compete for new citizens was a big part of why Auckland's housing crisis existed. The NZ Initiative had been pointing out these growth-limiting settings almost since its creation five years earlier.

In November 2015, Hartwich and the Labour Party's housing spokesperson Phil Twyford published a joint opinion piece advocating the abolition of height and density controls, infrastructure bonds, and an end to the rural-urban boundary. The article was interpreted as a shift from traditional Labour positions on land-use planning and regarded by international commentators as a sign of a new emerging consensus on housing policy.

The New Zealand Initiative's proposal to establish Special Economic Zones across New Zealand was supported by Wellington Mayor Justin Lester and Malcolm Alexander, chief executive of Local Government New Zealand. Government papers released under the Official Information Act revealed that cabinet ministers were considering the Initiative's proposals.

In a 2013 Initiative report, co-authored by former cabinet minister Michael Bassett, the Initiative proposed funding residential infrastructure through targeted rates in special purpose vehicles. The New Zealand government introduced such a scheme in July 2017 when it charged Crown Infrastructure Partners with this task.

Foreign direct investment
The New Zealand Initiative promotes the deregulation of New Zealand's restrictions on overseas investors, a position which attracted fierce criticism from New Zealand First leader Winston Peters.

Fisheries management
Based on comparative research, the Initiative proposed to establish a new agency to represent recreational fishing interests, modelled on the Western Australian body Recfishwest. The proposal was rejected by fishing advocacy group LegaSea.

Immigration
In its immigration report, the New Zealand Initiative defended New Zealand's liberal immigration policy, arguing that migrants contribute positively to the economy and integrate well into New Zealand society. Winston Peters rejected the Initiative's findings as "academic gobbledygook" and attacked the Initiative for being a thinktank run by foreigners. The Labour Party's Immigration spokesperson Iain Lees-Galloway welcomed the report while criticising its alleged ignorance of migrants' infrastructure needs.

Social policy
The Initiative supported the Key/English government's 'Social Investment Approach,' including the introduction of Social Impact Bonds. It has also argued that concerns about the recent rise of economic inequality were driven by rising house prices while income inequality in New Zealand had remained constant since the 1990s.

References

External links 
 

Economy of New Zealand
Think tanks based in New Zealand
Libertarian think tanks